William Baird (1876 – unknown) was a Scottish footballer who played in the Football League for Stoke.

Career
Baird was born in Glasgow and played for Morton before earning a move to English side Stoke in 1896. He played three matches for Stoke during the 1896–97 season all of which came during the first month of the season. He soon left the club however presumably to return to Scotland.

Career statistics

References

Scottish footballers
Greenock Morton F.C. players
Stoke City F.C. players
English Football League players
1876 births
Year of death missing
Association football forwards